Betty Stöve and Frew McMillan were the defending champions, but lost in the final against Greer Stevens and Bob Hewitt. The score was 6–3, 7–5.

Seeds

Draw

Finals

Top half

Bottom half

References

External links
1979 US Open – Doubles draws and results at the International Tennis Federation

Mixed doubles
US Open (tennis) by year – Mixed doubles